Wilmink is a surname. Notable people with the surname include:

Titia Wilmink (born 1968), Dutch tennis player
Willem Wilmink (1936–2003), Dutch poet and writer